The Millsaps-Buie House is a historic mansion in Jackson, Mississippi, U.S.. It was built for Major Reuben Webster Millsaps, a veteran of the Confederate States Army during the American Civil War who became a wealthy cotton broker and banker after the war. It was inherited by his nephew, Webster Millsaps Buie, in 1916. The house was designed in the Queen Anne architectural style. It has been listed on the National Register of Historic Places since June 19, 1973.

References

Houses on the National Register of Historic Places in Mississippi
Queen Anne architecture in Mississippi
Houses completed in 1888
National Register of Historic Places in Jackson, Mississippi